Scholastique of Champagne (also Scholastica; 1172–1219) was the daughter of Marie of France and Count Henry I of Champagne.

Marriage and issue
She married William IV of Mâcon (d. 1224) and had the following issue:

 Gerard II of Mâcon (d. 1224), married in 1220 to Guigone de Forez (d. 1240).  His daughter Alix (died 1260) inherited rule of Mâcon after both William IV and Gerard II died in 1224.  
 Henry (d. 1233)
 William (d. 1233)
 Beatrice married in 1219 to Hugh, seigneur d'Antigny (1200– 1243)

Death and burial at Troyes
Scholastique died in 1219 and was buried in collegiate church of Saint-Etienne in Troyes. The church contained the tombs of Marie, Countess of Champagne, Henry I, Count of Champagne, Marie of Champagne, Henry II, and Theobald.  Her sister-in-law Countess-Regent Blanche of Navarre would later be buried there as well.

Notes

Sources
 Gothic tombs of kinship in France, the low countries, and England – Anne McGee Morganstern, John A. Goodall

Counts of Mâcon
House of Blois 
1172 births
1219 deaths
12th-century French women
12th-century French people
13th-century French women
13th-century French people